Thryssocypris ornithostoma is a species of cyprinid of the genus Thryssocypris. It feeds on insects and is considered harmless to humans. It has not been classified on the IUCN Red List.

References

Cyprinid fish of Asia
Fish described in 1991